The British Polling Council (BPC) is an association of market research companies whose opinion polls are regularly published or broadcast in media in the United Kingdom.

The BPC was established in 2004, twelve years after the perceived failure of opinion polls to come close to predicting the actual result of the 1992 United Kingdom general election. BPC members use a range of fieldwork methods (telephone, door-to-door, and internet) and statistical tools.

Members
The following organisations are members of the BPC (founding members in bold):
BMG Research
Bradshaw Advisory
Censuswide
Deltapoll
Electoral Calculus
Focaldata
Forefront Market Research
Hanbury Strategy
Harris Interactive
ICM Research
Ipsos MORI
J.L. Partners
Kantar Public (formerly TNS/System 3)
LucidTalk
Obsurvant
Omnisis
Opinium
ORB International
Panelbase
People Polling
Portland Communications
Public First
Redfield & Wilton Strategies
SavantaComRes
Sky Data
Stack Data Strategy
Survation
Techne
WA Communications
Yonder Consulting
YouGov

NOP (now known as GfK) was a founding member, but is no longer a member as of 2018.

See also
Evaluation
Quantitative research
Psephology
Social research
Statistics
Statistical survey
Voodoo poll
Elections in the United Kingdom
Politics of the United Kingdom
Market research

References

External links
Official website

Psephology
Communications and media organisations based in the United Kingdom
Business organisations based in the United Kingdom
2004 establishments in the United Kingdom
Organizations established in 2004
Polling organisations in the United Kingdom